Marshall Conring Johnston (born May 10, 1930) is an American botanist who made several explorations in Mexico and specialized in plants in the family Gesneriaceae.

Johnston was born in San Antonio in the family of Theodore Harris Johnston and Lucile Mary Conring. He went on his first botanical expeditions to Mexico while still in high school during 1945-1947. On those trips he visited the northern Mexican states of Tamaulipas, Nuevo Leon, Coahuila, Durango, and Zacatecas. From 1972-1974 he made trips to Chihuahua, concentrating on desert flora. These early 1970s trips resulted in the bulk of his botanic collection. Marshal participated in the creation of the books Flora of Texas, Flora of North America, and Flora Neotropica. Johnston was also a professor at the University of Texas at Austin.

Plant namesakes 
 Marshalljohnstonia (genus), Henrickson, 1976
 Colubrina johnstonii, T.Wendt, 1983
 Crataegus johnstonii, J.B.Phipps, 1997
 Euphorbia johnstonii, Mayfield, 1991
 Frankenia johnstonii, Correll, 1966
 Hedeoma johnstonii, R.S.Irving, 1977
 Karwinskia johnstonii, R.Fernández, 1988
 Matelea johnstonii, Shinners, 1964
 Nerisyrenia johnstonii, J.D.Bacon, 1978
 Phacelia marshall-johnstonii, N.D.Atwood & Pinkava, 1977
 Portulaca johnstonii, Henrickson, 1981
 Johnstonalia, Tortosa, 2006

Works

References

External links 

21st-century American botanists
1930 births
Living people
People from San Antonio
University of Texas at Austin people